Jiří Rys (born March 31, 1992) is a Czech professional ice hockey player. He currently plays with HC Pardubice of the Czech Extraliga.

Rys made his Czech Extraliga debut playing with BK Mlada Boleslav during the 2011–12 Czech Extraliga season.

References

External links

1992 births
Living people
Czech ice hockey forwards
HC Dynamo Pardubice players
HC Stadion Litoměřice players
BK Mladá Boleslav players
HC Benátky nad Jizerou players
HC Dukla Jihlava players
HC Slavia Praha players